Scott Jones (born 1 May 1975) is an English former professional footballer who played as a midfielder or defender. He is perhaps most remembered for when he scored a brace as Barnsley defeated Manchester United in the 1998 FA Cup 5th round replay. He later went on to play for Mansfield Town, Notts County, Bristol Rovers and York City, where he scored once against Swansea City.

References

External links

1975 births
Living people
Footballers from Sheffield
English footballers
Association football defenders
Association football midfielders
Barnsley F.C. players
Mansfield Town F.C. players
Notts County F.C. players
Bristol Rovers F.C. players
York City F.C. players
English Football League players
Premier League players